Davy Schollen (born 28 February 1978) is a Belgian retired goalkeeper who last played for Sint-Truiden. He has been capped once for the national team, in 2006 against Turkey.

Titles and Successes 
 Belgian Champion: 2007, 2010, 2012
 Belgian Cup Winner: 2008
 Belgian Super Cup Winner: 2006, 2007, 2010

References

External links
 
 
 

1978 births
Living people
Belgian footballers
Belgium international footballers
Association football goalkeepers
Sint-Truidense V.V. players
K.R.C. Genk players
NAC Breda players
R.S.C. Anderlecht players
Belgian Pro League players
Eredivisie players
People from Sint-Truiden
Footballers from Limburg (Belgium)